{{Infobox NASCAR team
| Team_name     = Hendrick Motorsports No. 24 car
| Logo          = JeffGordonTwentyFour.jpg
| Owner_names   = Rick HendrickLinda HendrickJeff Gordon
| Base          = 4400 Papa Joe Hendrick Blvd, Concord, North Carolina, 28262
| Series        = NASCAR Cup Series
| Drivers       = Jeff Gordon (1992–2015)Chase Elliott (2016–2017)William Byron (2018–present)
| Sponsors      = DuPont/Axalta (1992-2015, 2018-Present) Pepsi/Mountain Dew (2001-2017)Nicorette (2006-2008)National Guard (2009-2010)AARP (2011-2015)Panasonic (2014-2015)3M (2015-2016)NAPA (2016-2017)Kelley Blue Book (2016-2017)SunEnergy1 (2016-2017)Little Caesars (2017)Hooters (2017)Liberty University (2018-Present)Hertz (2018-2020)UniFirst (2018-2019)Hendrick Automotive Group (2018-2020)Valvoline (2021-present)Acronis (2022-present)
| Manufacturer  = Chevrolet
| Opened        = 1992
| Debut         = 1992 Hooters 500 (Atlanta)
| Final         = 
| Races         = 
| Drivers_champ = 4
| Wins          = 99
| Poles         = 92
}}
The Hendrick Motorsports No. 24 car' is a NASCAR Cup Series team that has been active since 1992. The team began with driver Jeff Gordon, who spent his entire full-time career behind the wheel of the No. 24. Gordon won 93 points-paying races, the most of any driver in NASCAR's modern era, and four series championships before retiring from full-time racing in 2015. The No. 24 was driven by Chase Elliott in 2016 and 2017; Elliott earned a spot in the NASCAR playoffs both seasons but failed to win a points-paying race. Since 2018, the No. 24 has been driven by William Byron. Gordon, Elliott and Byron each earned Cup Series Rookie of the Year honors while using the No. 24.

History

Jeff Gordon (1992–2015)
Gordon and his crew chief, Ray Evernham, were signed away from Bill Davis Racing after Rick Hendrick watched Gordon drive BDR's No.1 Ford to his first Busch Series victory at Atlanta Motor Speedway in March 1992. The car number was originally intended to be No. 46, a Hendrick car driven by Greg Sacks for the filming of Days of Thunder in 1989 and 1990, but was changed after a licensing conflict with Paramount Pictures. No. 24 was selected due to its insignificance in NASCAR history prior to Gordon; at the time no driver had ever won a Cup race in the No. 24.

Gordon debuted in the 1992 Hooters 500, using his now-iconic DuPont rainbow paint scheme designed by Sam Bass, qualifying 21st and finishing 31st after a crash. The team went full-time in 1993 with Ray Evernham serving as crew chief. Gordon won his Twin 125 qualifying race at Daytona and finished fifth in the Daytona 500. He finished 14th in points and won Cup Series Rookie of the Year. In 1994, Gordon scored his first Winston Cup victory in the Coca-Cola 600, won the inaugural Brickyard 400 at Indianapolis, and finished the season eighth in points. Gordon won the 1995 Winston Cup championship, and finished second behind Hendrick teammate Terry Labonte in 1996.

Throughout the mid-90s, Gordon and Evernham's team became known as the "Rainbow Warriors," a nickname derived from the No. 24's colorful paint scheme and the similarly bright jumpsuits worn by the team's pit crew. Evernham became famous for his innovation improving the duration and efficiency of pit stops. Instead of using team mechanics as his pit crew, as was customary at the time, Evernham created a group of specialists (often former athletes) who trained using choreography, agility exercises, and weight lifting. The team studied film between races to identify spots for improvement. Evernham is largely credited with reducing the expected duration of a four-tire pit stop from around 20 seconds to under 15.

Gordon won his second championship in 1997, winning three of NASCAR's crown jewel races (the Daytona 500, Coca-Cola 600, and Southern 500). He won his second consecutive and third overall title in 1998, tying Richard Petty's modern-era record for wins in a season with 13. The following season, Gordon again won the Daytona 500, but the No. 24 team struggled with consistency and failed to win a third straight title. Crew chief Ray Evernham left the team to assist in Dodge's pending return to NASCAR, and was replaced by Brian Whitesell, who guided Gordon to wins in his first two races as crew chief. At the end of the season, Gordon signed a "lifetime" contract with Hendrick Motorsports, giving him partial ownership of the team.

Robbie Loomis replaced Brian Whitesell (who was promoted to team manager) in 2000, a season which saw Gordon score his 50th career victory at Talladega and finish ninth in points. In 2001, the No. 24 car unveiled a new blue- and red-flamed paint scheme, also designed by Bass, as lead sponsor DuPont expanded its marketing beyond automotive finishes. Gordon bounced back with six wins, six poles, and 24 top 10 finishes, winning his fourth championship.

In 2002, Gordon became car owner for rookie Jimmie Johnson's No. 48 Lowe's Chevrolet, a team that has since tied a NASCAR record with seven Cup Series championships. After a pair of top-five points finishes in 2003 and 2004, Gordon won three of the first nine races in 2005, including his third Daytona 500 win. However, Gordon ultimately missed the Chase for the Nextel Cup and finished 11th in points, the first time since his rookie year he finished outside the top 10. The following season was more productive for Gordon and new crew chief Steve Letarte, returning to the Chase and finishing sixth in points. In 2007, despite winning six races and scoring a modern-era record 30 top-10 finishes, Gordon finished second in points to teammate Johnson. Gordon returned to the Chase in 2008, but failed to win a race for the first time since his rookie year. Following the 2008 season, Gordon appeared on The Today Show'' to unveil his new "Firestorm" paint scheme for 2009 and beyond, which expanded the car's red flames and replaced the blue trim with black. Gordon broke a 47-race winless drought on April 4, 2009 at Texas, his first win at the track.

At the start of the 2011 season, a HMS organizational shuffle saw Gordon, the No. 24 and his sponsors move to the 5/88 shop, with Mark Martin's former crew chief Alan Gustafson becoming crew chief of the No. 24 team. The same year, AARP became the team's primary sponsor, partnering with Gordon to form the "Drive to End Hunger" initiative. Pepsi continued its associate sponsor deal, and DuPont scaled back to 14 races as primary sponsor. Gordon won three races and finished eighth in points. An inconsistent 2012 season meant Gordon needed a late-season win at Pocono to sneak into the Chase. Weeks later, Gordon, upset about an earlier altercation, intentionally wrecked championship contender Clint Bowyer during the final laps of the AdvoCare 500 and was fined $100,000. Gordon ended the season with Hendrick Motorsports' first Cup Series win at Homestead-Miami Speedway. This was also the final race of a 20-year relationship between the No. 24 team and DuPont; Axalta Coating Systems replaced DuPont's 14-race sponsorship.

Gordon was added to the 2013 Chase following "Spingate" at Richmond, but failed to win his fifth Cup title. The following season, Gordon was in position to reach the championship round until late-race shuffling at Phoenix left him just short.

On January 22, 2015, Gordon announced the upcoming season would be his final as a full-time Cup Series driver. 3M signed on to sponsor the No. 24 for 11 races over three seasons, joining AARP and Axalta as primary sponsors. Gordon raced his famous rainbow paint scheme for the final time in the 2015 Irwin Tools Night Race; a loose wheel resulted in a 26th-place finish. Gordon secured a spot in the championship round by winning at Martinsville, breaking a 39-race winless streak in what would be his final Cup Series victory. Axalta unveiled a special silver paint scheme to commemorate Gordon's career at Homestead, and Hendrick's other three cars raced with yellow number decals to honor Gordon. Gordon finished sixth in the race and third in the final points standings. Gordon returned as a part-time Cup Series driver in 2016, filling in for an injured Dale Earnhardt Jr. in the No. 88 car.

Chase Elliott (2016–2017)

In 2016, Hendrick development driver Chase Elliott became the second driver to race the No. 24 car for Hendrick Motorsports. The team's primary sponsor became NAPA Auto Parts, which had previously sponsored Elliott in the Xfinity Series (3M scaled back its sponsorship and Axalta moved to the No. 88 team). Elliott won the pole in his first Daytona 500 start, but finished 37th after an early crash. Despite a winless season, Elliott made the Chase and won Cup Series Rookie of the Year.

After a fifth-place finish in 2017, Hendrick Motorsports announced the No. 24 would be renumbered to No. 9, allowing Elliott to drive the same car number his father Bill raced for 20 years. Instead of retiring the No. 24, Hendrick renumbered Kasey Kahne's No. 5 to No. 24, with rookie William Byron replacing Kahne as the team's driver.

William Byron (2018–present)

Byron and crew chief Darian Grubb struggled through the 2018 season, finishing in the top 10 only four times and ending the season 23rd in the standings. After just one season, Hendrick Motorsports replaced Grubb with Chad Knaus, who was crew chief for seven Cup Series championships for Hendrick's No. 48 team.

The pairing of Byron and Knaus immediately led to improved results, as Byron won the pole for the 2019 Daytona 500. The team won four more poles over the course of the 2019 season, making the Playoffs and finishing 11th. Despite not winning a race in 2019, on August 29, 2020, Byron won at Daytona, making it 94 wins overall.

The 2021 season opened with two finished outside of the top 20, but in the third race of the year at Homestead-Miami, he took his second career win (the 95th for the 24) after dominating the second half of the race. Since winning at Homestead-Miami, Byron has finished in the Top 10 in twelve of the next fourteen races. During the playoffs, Byron made it to the Round of 12, but struggled with poor finishes at Las Vegas and Talladega. Following the Charlotte Roval race, he was eliminated from the Round of 8. Byron finished 10th in the points standings.

During the 2022 season, Byron started with two DNFs at the 2022 Daytona 500 and Fontana, but rebounded with wins at Atlanta and Martinsville. On July 28, three days prior to the Indianapolis road race, the generator of the No. 24's hauler caught fire. The car was not damaged by the blaze. At the Texas playoff race, Byron spun Denny Hamlin towards the infield grass during a late-caution period; he was subsequently fined 50,000 and the No. 24 was docked 25 driver and owner points. On October 6, the National Motorsports Appeals Panel rescinded the points penalty and instead amended the fine to 100,000, placing Byron back to seventh in the playoff standings. Byron was eliminated following the Round of 8 after finishing eighth at Martinsville (Byron would be credited a 7th-place finish after 4th-place finisher Brad Keselowski was disqualified when his car failed to meet minimum-weight requirements).

Byron started the 2023 season with a 34th place DNF at the 2023 Daytona 500. He later scored back-to-back wins at Las Vegas and Phoenix. On March 15, the No. 24 was served an L2 penalty after unapproved hood louvers were found installed on the car during pre-race inspection at Phoenix; as a result, the team was docked 100 driver and owner points and 10 playoff points. In addition, Fugle was suspended for four races and fined 100,000.

Car No. 24 results

References

External links

 
 
 
 
 

1992 establishments in North Carolina
Jeff Gordon
NASCAR Cup Series
NASCAR teams
Auto racing teams established in 1992